Robert Timothy Leslie (born February 4, 1942) is an American politician from California and a member of the Republican Party in US.

Early life and education
Born in Ashland, Oregon, Leslie moved to California with his family as a two-year-old.  He earned his Bachelor of Science degree in political science at California State University, Long Beach where he was a member of Sigma Pi fraternity.  He then earned his Master of Public Administration from the University of Southern California.

State legislature
A one-time lobbyist, Leslie first ran for the California State Assembly in 1984, losing to Democratic incumbent Jean Moorhead Duffy by just 1 percent.  With Moorhead Duffy not seeking re-election in 1986, Leslie comfortably won election to the Sacramento area 5th District over Jack Dugan, an assistant state Attorney General.  He won re-election in 1988 and 1990 without serious opposition.  In 1991, Leslie ran for the California State Senate in a special election for the 1st district left vacant when GOP incumbent John Doolittle was elected to Congress.  He easily won re-election in 1992 and 1996.

In 2000, when term limits prevented him from seeking re-election to the State Senate, Leslie ran successfully for the 4th District in the State Assembly again and won re-election in 2002 and 2004.

Lieutenant Governor race
In 1998, Leslie was the Republican nominee for Lieutenant Governor; but he lost to Democrat Cruz Bustamante 52.7% to 38.8%.

References

External links
JoinCalifornia

1942 births
Living people
Politicians from Ashland, Oregon
California State University, Long Beach alumni
USC Sol Price School of Public Policy alumni
Republican Party members of the California State Assembly
Republican Party California state senators
21st-century American politicians